Patrick Wiencek (born 22 March 1989) is a German handballer playing for THW Kiel.

He retired from international duty in March 2022.

Achievements
Summer Olympics:
: 2016
National Championship of Germany:
: 2013, 2014, 2015, 2020, 2021

References

External links

1989 births
Living people
German male handball players
Sportspeople from Duisburg
Olympic handball players of Germany
Handball players at the 2016 Summer Olympics
Medalists at the 2016 Summer Olympics
Olympic bronze medalists for Germany
Olympic medalists in handball
Handball-Bundesliga players
VfL Gummersbach players
THW Kiel players
Bergischer HC players
21st-century German people